Joseph Bonello (born 4 April 1961) is a Maltese bishop who currently serves as the bishop of Juticalpa in Honduras.

Joe Bonello was born in Xagħra on the island of Gozo in Malta on 4 April 1961, the third of four children. In 1977 he joined the Franciscan novitiate in Għajnsielem and six years later was professed as a member of the Order of Friars Minor. He was ordained deacon on 29 June 1984 and a year later a priest by Archbishop Joseph Mercieca. Bonello studied philosophy and theology at the National Institute of Religious Ecclesiastical Studies in Malta and in September 1989 he left for a mission in Central America. During his time in Central America he served as he served as pastor of many parishes including that of Santa Ana in La Libertad.

In 2009 Bonello was appointed as vicar general of the Diocese of Comayagua  by its bishop Roberto Camilleri Azzopardi. A year later on 22 November 2010 Pope Benedict XVI appointed him Coadjutor Bishop of Juticalpa in Honduras. He was consecrated bishop by Cardinal Óscar Andrés Rodríguez Maradiaga on 12 February 2011. After the resignation of bishop Tomás Andrés Mauro Muldoon, Bonello succeeded him as the Bishop of Juticalpa.

References

External links
 Catholic Hierarchy
 Times of Malta
 The Malta Independent

20th-century Maltese Roman Catholic priests
1961 births
21st-century Roman Catholic bishops in Honduras
Living people
People from Xagħra
Capuchin bishops
Roman Catholic bishops of Juticalpa